Bokoro Airport  is an airport serving the city of Bokoro in Mai-Ndombe Province, Democratic Republic of the Congo. The province of Mai-Ndombe is one of three regions the former province of Bandundu has been divided into.

Trivia
Officially, Bokoro Airport does not have an ICAO-Code. However, the code FZBC is attributed to Bikoro Airport, allegedly serving the town of Bikoro. Bikoro never had an airport as various old maps and aeronautical charts confirm. It is instead served by the airfield of Yembe-Moke (FZEM) located 7 miles north-east of the town. Additionally, the third letter "B" in the code indicates that the airport is located the former province of Bandundu. Bikoro is located in the former province of Equateur. It is therefore assumed that FZBC is actually the ICAO code intended for Bokoro airport that has been wrongly assigned due to a spelling error.

See also

 Transport in the Democratic Republic of the Congo
 List of airports in the Democratic Republic of the Congo

References

External links
 HERE Maps - Bokoro
 OpenStreetMap - Bokoro

Airports in Mai-Ndombe Province